The Tuni language may refer to:
Tunni language, an Afro-Asiatic language spoken in Somalia
Lorhon language, a Niger-Congo language spoken in the Ivory Coast